Sōichirō, Soichiro, Souichirou or Sohichiroh is a masculine Japanese given name. Notable people with the name include:

, Japanese basketball player
, founder of Honda Motor Company
, Japanese voice actor
, president of Benesse Corporation
, Japanese sport shooter
, Japanese footballer
, Japanese footballer
, Japanese voice actor
, Japanese writer

Fictional characters 
Soichiro Koizumi of Guru Guru Pon-chan
 of Fate/stay night
 of Death Note
 of Kill la Kill

Japanese masculine given names